The Spanish Requirement of 1513 (Requerimiento) was a declaration by the Spanish monarchy, written by the Council of Castile jurist Juan López de Palacios Rubios, of Castile's divinely ordained right to take possession of the territories of the New World and to subjugate, exploit and, when necessary, to fight the native inhabitants. 

The Requerimiento (Spanish for "requirement" as in "demand") was read to Native Americans to inform them of Spain's rights to conquest. The Spaniards thus considered those who resisted as defying God's plan, and so used Catholic theology to justify their conquest.

Historical context
In 1452, Pope Nicholas V issued the papal bull Dum Diversas, which legitimized the slave trade, at least as a result of war. It granted Afonso V of Portugal the right to reduce war-conquered "Saracens, pagans and any other unbelievers" to hereditary slavery. As such, the Dominican friars who arrived at the Spanish settlement at Santo Domingo in 1510 strongly denounced the enslavement of the local Indigenous residents. Along with other priests, they opposed the native peoples' treatment as unjust and illegal in an audience with the Spanish king and in the subsequent royal commission.

In Spain itself in 1492, the Moorish population of Granada had been given the choice by the first Archbishop of Granada, Hernando de Talavera: become Christian, or leave the country. In a letter to his religious brothers, Cardinal Cisneros, Talavera's successor, would celebrate the “peaceful domination” of the Moors of the Albaicin, a neighborhood of Granada, praising converts, lauding killing and extolling plunder. This letter came, however, after centuries of struggle by Christians in Spain to recapture what they saw as their homeland, which had been under Muslim rule for generations. Thus the war in Iberia, between Christians trying to "reconquer" land they thought of as properly Christian and Muslims defending the land their forefathers claimed by right of conquest, heightened religious tensions and fervor on both sides.

Comparing the situation in the Old World and New World: in Spain's wars against the Moors, the clerics claimed that Muslims had knowledge of Christ and rejected Him, so that waging a Crusade against them was legitimate; in contrast, in Spain's wars against the Indigenous peoples of the Americas and Native Americans, wars against those who had never come into contact with Christianity were illegitimate. Responding to this impeding clerical position, the Requerimiento was issued, providing a religious justification for war against and conquest of the local populations of pre-existing residents, on the pretext of their refusing the legitimate authority of the Kings of Spain and Portugal as granted by the Pope.

So, the Requerimiento emerged in the context of moral debates within Spanish elites over the colonization of the Americas, and associated actions such as war, slavery, 'Indian reductions', conversions, relocations, and war crimes. Its use was criticised by many clerical missionaries, most prominently Bartolomé de las Casas.

To the King and Queen of Spain (Ferdinand II of Aragon, 1452–1516 and Isabella I of Castile, 1451–1504) the conquest of indigenous peoples was justified by natural law, embodied in the medieval doctrine of “just wars”, which had historically been a rationale for war against non-Christians, particularly the Moors, but which would now be applied to Native Americans. Coming shortly after the Reconquest, the realization of a centuries-long dream by Christians in Spain, the discovery, and colonization of the New World was directly affected by religious and political conditions in a now-unified Iberian Peninsula.

Legal justification
Concerned that Spain would ensure control of the natives in the newly conquered Americas, the “Reyes Católicos”, Ferdinand and Isabella, consulted theologians and jurists for religious and legal justification of Spain's conquests. The treatment of the Native Americans was at first rationalized on the grounds that they were cannibals; any means of subjugation were acceptable. However, some of Christopher Columbus’s tactics with Native Americans had resulted in uprisings. In 1500, the king and queen again sought advice; the Native Americans were declared to be "free vassals". Despite their elevated status, the Native Americans remained subject to conquest in "just wars".

The Laws of Burgos of 1512 marked the first in a series of ordinances (“Ordenanzas sobre el buen tratamiento de los indios”) with the ostensible goal of protecting the Indians from excessive exploitation; natives could celebrate holidays, be paid for their labor and receive "good treatment". Similar legislation was adopted by the Junta of Valladolid in 1513 and the Junta of Madrid in 1516.

Role of religion

The colonization of the New World by European adventurers was "justified" at the time on spiritual and religious grounds. In the conquest of the Americas, the Christian duty to evangelize nonbelievers took the form of conversion of Indians and other pagans at the hands of Roman Catholic priests.

To the European mind, the lands of the New World belonged to no one and could, therefore, be seized. The radical differences in thought and behavior of the Aztec and Mayan states, with their worship of entirely new, fierce gods, human sacrifice by the thousands and complete unfamiliarity with European styles of diplomacy created a sense that conquest was not a war between states but the conquering, by a civilized, society against a ferocious, barbarous enemy. Moreover, since the native population was non-Christian, the Europeans' Christian religion conferred upon them the right and indeed the obligation to take possession of the lands and the people in the name of God and the throne.

More particularly, Catholic theology held that spiritual salvation took precedence over temporal and civil concerns. The conversion of pagan natives to Christianity was the rationale for and legitimized Spain's conquests. Thus "informed" by the Spanish, the Native people of the land had to accept the supremacy of the Catholic Church and the Spanish Crown. The state was authorized to enforce submission, by war if necessary.

Content
The 1513 Requerimiento, in relation to the Spanish invasion of the Americas and the subsequent Spanish colonization of the Americas, demanded the local populations to accept Spanish rule and allow preaching to them by Catholic missionaries on pain of war, slavery or death. The Requerimiento did not demand conversion, but the Indian Reductions through the Encomienda and Mission systems often did. This claim provided a legal loophole for enslavement of the population as rebellious vassals if they resisted, and the document stated: "We emphasise that any deaths that result from this [rejection of Christian rule] are your fault…."

The European view of the inherent right to conquest and domination in the New World was captured in a declaration addressed to Indian populations known as El Requerimiento (The Requirement). The document was prepared by the Spanish jurist Juan López de Palacios Rubios, a staunch advocate of the divine right of monarchs and territorial conquest. It was first used in 1514 by Pedrarias Dávila, a Spanish aristocrat who had fought the Moors in Granada and later became Governor of Nicaragua.

The Spanish Requirement, issued in the names of King Ferdinand and Queen Juana, his daughter, was a mixture of religious and legal justifications for the confiscation of New World territories and the subjugation of their inhabitants. At the time, it was believed that Native Americans resisted conquest and conversion for one of two reasons: malice or ignorance. The Requirement was putatively meant to eliminate ignorance.

A member of the conquistador's force would read El Requerimiento in Castilian before a group of Indians on the shore, who, with or without translation, remained uncomprehending. All the region's inhabitants were thus considered to have been advised of Spain's religious and legal rights to conquest and forewarned of the consequences of resisting. The true nature of the Spanish Requirement, however, was one of absolution; the symbolic act of reading the document relieved the crown and its agents from legal and moral responsibility for the conquest, enslavement and killing of Native Americans. Readings were often dispensed with prior to planned attacks.

As the Spanish Requirement matter-of-factly sets forth, so brazenly from five centuries' retrospect, God created heaven and earth, and the first man and woman from whom all are descended. God directed St Peter to establish the Roman Catholic Church. St Peter's descendant, the Pope, lives in Rome. The Pope has given the New World territories to the King of Castile and directed the conversion of the Indians. If they listen carefully, the Indians will understand and accept what is happening as just; if not, Spain will make war on them. 

Here what the document does is to create an ontology into which these new lands and their peoples fit; it is creating a place for them in the existing Spanish and European political structure and Christian belief structure.

Evaluation
Many critics of the conquistadors' policies were appalled by the flippant nature of the Requerimiento, and Bartolomé de las Casas said in response to it that he did not know whether to laugh or to cry. While the conquistadors were encouraged to use an interpreter to read the Requerimiento, it was not absolutely necessary, and in many cases, it was read out to an uncomprehending populace. 

In some instances, it was read to barren beaches and empty villages long after the indigenous people and communities had left, to prisoners after they were captured, and even from the decks of ships once they had just spotted the coast. Nevertheless, for the conquistadors, it provided a religious justification and rationalization for attacking and conquering the native population. Because of its potential to support the enrichment of the Spanish royal coffers, the Requerimiento was not generally questioned until the Spanish crown had abolished its use in 1556.

Text

See also
Black legend (Spain)
 La Toma
 Indian Reductions
 Spanish colonization of the Americas
 Valladolid debate

Notes

References

External links

 Full Requerimiento text in Spanish - Todos en Español

Spanish colonization of the Americas
History of indigenous peoples of North America
1513 works
16th-century documents
Government statements
Causes of war
History of Catholicism in South America
Legal history of Spain
1513 in law